Bruno Wende (April 17, 1859 – December 27, 1929) was a private serving in the United States Army during the Spanish–American War who received the Medal of Honor for bravery.

Biography
Wende was born April 17, 1859, in Germany and after immigrating to the United States, entered the army from Canton, Ohio. He was sent to fight in the Spanish–American War with Company C, 17th U.S. Infantry as a private where he received the Medal of Honor for his actions.

He died December 27, 1929, and is buried in Spring Grove Cemetery Cincinnati, Ohio. His grave can be found in section 70, space 1870.

Medal of Honor citation
Rank and organization: Private, Company C, 17th U.S. Infantry. Place and date: At El Caney, Cuba, 1 July 1898. Entered service at: Canton, Ohio. Birth: Germany. Date of issue: 22 June 1899.

Citation:

Gallantly assisted in the rescue of the wounded from in front of the lines and under heavy fire from the enemy.

See also

List of Medal of Honor recipients for the Spanish–American War

References

External links

1859 births
1929 deaths
United States Army Medal of Honor recipients
United States Army soldiers
American military personnel of the Spanish–American War
German emigrants to the United States
Burials in Ohio
German-born Medal of Honor recipients
Spanish–American War recipients of the Medal of Honor